is a 2016 Japanese mecha anime television special directed by Osamu Kamei and written by Miyuki Kishimoto, featuring character designs by Tsubasa Masao and mechanical designs by Shūichirō Satō. It premiered on 26 June 2016 on Fuji TV.

Characters

Production
The anime project was the winning contestant of Every Star's Bokutachi no Mitai Mecha Anime o Tsukurou Seisaku Iinkai contest, where fans could submit their original mecha anime proposals, and the proposal with the most votes would be turned into an anime. The anime's format was revealed in March 2016 to be a television special that will debut on Fuji TV on 26 June 2016. Osamu Kamei directed the anime and Miyuki Kishimoto wrote the scripts, while Tsubasa Masao designed the characters and Shūichirō Satō provided the mechanical designs. Taku Matsuo and Yūichirō Nogami produced the series.

References

External links
  
 

Anime with original screenplays
Fuji TV original programming
Mecha anime and manga
Japanese television specials